Lugal-ushumgal (lugal-ušumgal) was a Sumerian ruler (ensi, formerly read "Patesi") of Lagash ("Shirpula"), circa 2230-2210 BCE. Several inscriptions of Lugal-ushumgal are known, particularly seal impressions, which refer to him as governor of Lagash and at the same time a vassal (arad, "servant" or "slave") of the Akkadian Empire rulers Naram-Sin and his successor Shar-Kali-Sharri.

It can be considered that Lugalushumgal was a collaborator of the Akkadian Empire, as was Meskigal, ruler of Adab.

He was succeeded by Puzer-Mama who achieved independence from Shar-Kali-Sharri, assuming the title of "King of Lagash" and starting the illustrious Second Dynasty of Lagash.

Seal of Lugalushumgal as vassal of Naram-sin
The seal depicts a presentation scene of governor Lugal-ushumgal to a male deity. Lugal-ushumgal is shown standing to the left, carrying an animal offering for the deity. The inscription carries two blocks of columns:

Seal of Lugalushumgal as vassal of Shar-Kali-Sharri

The second seal again shows a presentation scene of governor Lugal-ushumgal to a seated deity. Lugal-ushumgal is shown standing to the left, carrying an animal offering for the deity. The inscription carries two blocks of columns:

References

Sources

Frayne, Douglas R. (1993). Sargonic and Gutian Periods (Toronto, Buffalo, London. University of Toronto Press Incorporated)

23rd-century BC Sumerian kings
Kings of Lagash